Holtwood Environmental Preserve is a protected area owned by PPL in southeastern Pennsylvania.  It covers over  near the Holtwood Dam on the Susquehanna River in Lancaster and York Counties, and includes  of mesophytic old-growth forest including eastern hemlock, chestnut oak, and umbrella magnolia along the Otter Creek gorge.  Visitor activities include camping, boating, and hiking.  It is a nesting site for bald eagles and ospreys.

References

Nature reserves in Pennsylvania
Old-growth forests
Protected areas of Lancaster County, Pennsylvania
Protected areas of York County, Pennsylvania